The Men's Sprint Tandem B1-3 cycling competition at the 2004 Summer Paralympics was held in the Olympic Velodrome from 19–21 September at the Olympic Velodrome.

The event was won by Kieran Modra and his sighted pilot David Short, representing . This was the first time in the Paralympic Games that a guide or pilot returned a positive sample in an anti-doping test.

Results

Ranking Round

Final Round

5-8 Place Matches

References

M